Severtzov's jerboa (Allactaga severtzovi) is an herbivorous species of rodent in the family Dipodidae.
It is found in Kazakhstan, Tajikistan, Turkmenistan, and Uzbekistan.

References

Allactaga
Mammals of Asia
Taxonomy articles created by Polbot
Mammals described in 1925